Bratčice is a municipality and village in Kutná Hora District in the Central Bohemian Region of the Czech Republic. It has about 400 inhabitants.

Notable people
Jan Perner (1815–1845), railway engineer

References

Villages in Kutná Hora District